In noncommutative geometry, the JLO cocycle is a cocycle (and thus defines a cohomology class) in entire cyclic cohomology. It is a non-commutative version of the classic Chern character of the conventional differential geometry. In noncommutative geometry, the concept of a manifold is replaced by a noncommutative algebra  of "functions" on the putative noncommutative space. The cyclic cohomology of the algebra  contains the information about the topology of that noncommutative space, very much as the de Rham cohomology contains the information about the topology of a conventional manifold.

The JLO cocycle is associated with a metric structure of non-commutative differential geometry known as a -summable spectral triple (also known as a -summable Fredholm module).

-summable spectral triples 

A -summable spectral triple consists of the following data:

(a) A Hilbert space  such that  acts on it as an algebra of bounded operators.

We assume that the algebra  is even under the -grading, i.e. , for all .

(c) A self-adjoint (unbounded) operator , called the Dirac operator such that

(i)  is odd under , i.e. .

(iii) , for all .

A classic example of a -summable spectral triple arises as follows.

The cocycle 

The JLO cocycle  is a sequence

of functionals on the algebra , where

External links
  - The original paper introducing the JLO cocycle.
  - A nice set of lectures.

Noncommutative geometry